Michael D. "Mike" Greear is an American politician and a Republican member of the Wyoming House of Representatives representing District 27 since January 11, 2011.

Elections
2012 Greear was unopposed for both the August 21, 2012 Republican Primary, winning with 1,582 votes, and the November 6, 2012 General election, winning with 3,627 votes.
2010 When Democratic Representative Debbie Hammons retired and left the District 27 seat open, Greear was unopposed for both the August 17, 2010 Republican Primary, winning with 1,699 votes, and the November 2, 2010 General election, winning with 2,890 votes.

References

External links
Official page at the Wyoming Legislature
 

21st-century American politicians
1967 births
Living people
Republican Party members of the Wyoming House of Representatives
People from Worland, Wyoming
Place of birth missing (living people)
Wyoming lawyers